El Hachemi Abdenouz (born 1 July 1956) is a retired Algerian long-distance runner who specialized in the 5000 metres.

He reached the semi-final at the 1980 Olympic Games, and won the bronze medals at the 1979 Mediterranean Games and the 1983 Maghreb Championships.

His personal best time was 13.40.1 minutes, achieved in 1979.

References

External links
 

1956 births
Living people
Algerian male long-distance runners
Athletes (track and field) at the 1980 Summer Olympics
Olympic athletes of Algeria
Mediterranean Games bronze medalists for Algeria
Mediterranean Games medalists in athletics
Athletes (track and field) at the 1979 Mediterranean Games
21st-century Algerian people
20th-century Algerian people